Kolonnawa  is a town located on the eastern boundary of Colombo District, Western Province of Sri Lanka.  It is bounded by Kelani River to the north, Kotikawatta-Mulleriyawa Pradeshiya Sabha to the East, Kotte Municipal Council to the south and Colombo Municipal Council to the west.

Kolonnawa Urban Council

Zone  
 Kolonnawa
 Orugodawatte
 Wellampitiya

Demographics
Kolonnawa Municipality area is a multi-ethnic, multi-religious urban centre. According to the census of 2012, the demographics by ethnicity and religion is as follows:.

References

Populated places in Colombo District